Emilio Antonio Gamboa Patrón (born 23 August 1950) is a Mexican politician affiliated with the PRI. He was Senator during the 2000–2003 and 2003–2006 Legislatures and deputy during the LX Legislature  and the LXII Legislature of the Mexican Congress during 2012-2015 and LXIII Legislature, 2015-2018.

References

1950 births
Living people
Politicians from Mexico City
Members of the Senate of the Republic (Mexico)
Members of the Chamber of Deputies (Mexico)
Institutional Revolutionary Party politicians
21st-century Mexican politicians
Universidad Iberoamericana alumni